Ronald Leslie Botchan (February 15, 1935 – January 28, 2021) was an American football official from the National Football League (NFL). Prior to that he was an American football linebacker in the American Football League from 1960 to 1962. As an official, Botchan worked as an umpire for nearly his entire NFL career and wore the number 110.  Regarded as the "NFL's best umpire" by the media, Botchan was assigned to a record-number five Super Bowls: XX in 1986, XXVII in 1993, XXIX in 1995, XXXI in 1997, and XXXIV in 2000. He was also an alternate in Super Bowl XXVI in 1992, and Super Bowl XXXVI in 2002.  He rapidly ascended to the NFL ranks after nine years of officiating high school and college games and attributes his success to being "coachable".

High school and college years
Botchan played linebacker at Belmont High School and later at Occidental College in Los Angeles, California.  At Occidental, Botchan was a teammate to Jack Kemp and Jim Mora; and was a collegiate All-Conference baseball player and an All-Conference and Little All-American linebacker.

Professional career

NFL player
Botchan was drafted by the Baltimore Colts in 1957, but went to play football in the United States Marine Corps.  He was selected to the All-Marine and All-Service teams playing linebacker for the Marine Corps Base Quantico and Camp Lejune teams.  In 1960, Botchan was approached by scouts of the new upstart American Football League (AFL) and signed a contract for $6,000 to play for the Los Angeles Chargers under head coach Sid Gillman as a starting linebacker.  Ron signed with the Houston Oilers the next year only to have his football playing career ended due to a knee injury.  He played in the first two American Football League Championship Games, losing the first with the Chargers vs. the Oilers, and winning the second when the Oilers again defeated the Chargers in the 1961 AFL Championship.

Coaching
After his playing days ended, Botchan took up coaching football. From 1966 to 1972, Ron built the Los Angeles City College team into a winning program that included several league championships.

NFL official
Botchan's officiating career began in 1972 after moving away from coaching and until 1976 was working high school and junior college football games.  He was assigned two games as an umpire in the Pac-10 between 1976 and 1979 before applying and being accepted to the NFL in 1980.

In 1980, Botchan joined the NFL as a line judge because no openings were available as an umpire.  As a rookie, he received a rare opportunity to officiate a playoff game due to having a successful season.  Historically, rookie officials in the NFL do not participate in the playoffs.  An opportunity opened up for Botchan the following year at the umpire position, which he accepted, and stayed for the remainder of his career in the league.

His last game was a National Football Conference (NFC) Championship Game between the Philadelphia Eagles and St. Louis Rams on January 27, 2002, and his final appearance was at Super Bowl XXXVI on February 3, 2002, as an alternate official.  Botchan served as an assistant supervisor of officials for the NFL.

Notable events
Botchan five Super Bowls is tied with NFL officials Tom Kelleher, Jack Fette, and Al Jury.
Worked Super Bowl XXXIV that involved the final play in which the Tennessee Titans came up one yard short from tying the score against the St. Louis Rams.  The play would become known as "The Tackle".
During a game in the late 1990s, Botchan was knocked to the ground and suffered a cut to his head.  He continued without missing a single play of the game, but later required eight stitches.
Botchan once proposed a helmet designed to look like an officials' hat worn by the umpire to protect against head injuries.
Was a mentor to Matt Millen (former NFL player, television commentator, later General Manager of the Detroit Lions), who trained to become an official during a 2000 NFL pre-season game in Foxboro, Massachusetts, to demonstrate the "Ump Cam" used by Fox Sports to television viewers.  The "Ump Cam" was a small camera placed on the bill of the official's cap to bring the action closer to the television audience.
Botchan was the umpire during a 1988 NFL season game on December 31 between the Philadelphia Eagles and Chicago Bears at Soldier Field played under heavy fog.  This game became known in NFL lore as the "Fog Bowl".
In 1997 he was inducted into the Southern California Jewish Sports Hall of Fame.

See also
 List of American Football League players
 List of Super Bowl officials

References

1935 births
2021 deaths
Belmont High School (Los Angeles) alumni
National Football League officials
Houston Oilers players
Los Angeles Chargers players
Occidental Tigers football players
Los Angeles City Cubs football coaches
Sportspeople from Brooklyn
Players of American football from New York City
Players of American football from Los Angeles
Jewish American sportspeople
American Football League players
21st-century American Jews
Sportspeople from Los Angeles
Sports coaches from Los Angeles